Mark Ferry (born 19 January 1984) is a Scottish professional footballer for Scottish League Two side Stenhousemuir.

Career
Ferry started his career with St Johnstone and has also played for Forfar Athletic, Queen's Park, Raith Rovers and Stirling Albion. In July 2015, Ferry signed for with Albion Rovers. He scored his first Rovers goal, a long-range drive, in the club's 2–0 derby win against Airdrie on 24 September 2016. In June 2017, Ferry signed for Scottish League Two club Stenhousemuir.

Career statistics

References

External links

Living people
1984 births
Footballers from Glasgow
Scottish footballers
St Johnstone F.C. players
Forfar Athletic F.C. players
Queen's Park F.C. players
Raith Rovers F.C. players
Stirling Albion F.C. players
Albion Rovers F.C. players
Stenhousemuir F.C. players
Association football defenders
Association football midfielders
Scottish Football League players